The tradition of black ceramics goes back to prehistoric times. The oldest articles of black ceramics date back to 6 thousand years BC. They were made in Babylon and Persia, China and Egypt, and later in Greece, Rome and America.

In Lithuania black ceramics were used since the Neolithic Age. During the 1st millennium AD this technique was used to produce anthropomorphic urns and other cult vessels. This technique was very common in the medieval Europe. The Modern Age saw enamel techniques gaining prevalence and black ceramics pushed aside. In XX c. black ceramics became rarity. Lithuania is one of the few locations in the world where black ceramics has been preserved and still prospers.

References

Lithuanian culture
History of ceramics